Shasta Lake, also popularly known as Lake Shasta, is a reservoir in Shasta County, California, United States. It began to store water in 1944 due to the impounding of the Sacramento River by Shasta Dam, the ninth tallest dam in the United States.

Shasta Lake is a key facility of the Central Valley Project and provides flood control for the Sacramento Valley downstream of the dam. Water outflow generates power through the Shasta Powerplant and is subsequently used for irrigation and municipal purposes.

The reservoir lies within the Whiskeytown–Shasta–Trinity National Recreation Area, operated by the Shasta-Trinity National Forest. The California Office of Environmental Health Hazard Assessment (OEHHA) has developed a safe eating advisory for fish caught in the lake based on levels of mercury or PCBs found in local species.

Geography

Ten miles (16 km) north of the city of Redding, with the town of Lakehead on its northern shore, Shasta Lake is popular for boating, water skiing, camping, house boating and fishing. Formed by the damming of the Sacramento River, the lake has  of mostly steep mountainous shoreline covered with tall evergreen trees and manzanita.

The lake has four major arms, each created by an approaching river: the Sacramento River, the McCloud River, Squaw Creek, and the Pit River. The Sacramento River's source is the Klamath Mountains. The McCloud River's source is Mount Shasta. The Pit River flows from Alturas, and the waterfall Potem Falls is located on that arm of the lake.

History
Shasta Dam was constructed between 1935 and 1945 across the Sacramento River, and Shasta Lake was formed in 1948. The Pit River, McCloud River, and several smaller tributaries had their lower courses and confluences with the Sacramento River submerged by the reservoir. Also beneath the lake is the submerged town of Kennett and many village sites of the Wintun people together with their traditional fishing, hunting, and gathering locations. Parts of the defunct tunnels and right of way of the Southern Pacific Transportation Company can be seen when the water level is low.

Shasta Lake hosted the first "Boardstock" event in 1996, which continued there annually through 1999, after which the annual event moved to Clear Lake, California, 170 miles southwest of Shasta Lake. Boardstock drew many professional wakeboard riders from around the world, with an average attendance of 15,000 people.  The event lasted for 3 days each year with several wakeboard contests being performed.

Marinas
There are a number of marinas on Shasta Lake offering a variety of services, including houseboat rentals.

 Bridge Bay Marina is the largest marina on Shasta lake with over 700 slips. It has a restaurant, bar, and lodging, as well as retail and other facilities. Visitors to Bridge Bay may rent one of 100 houseboats, as well as ski boats, fishing boats, patio boats, and personal water craft such as stand up paddle boards, jet skis, and Jetovators. Bridge Bay boasts a busy public dock during the summer season, with a gas dock, food, ice and retail amenities.
 Digger Bay Marina has over 150 boat slips in the marina, as well as a retail store and small boat rental. Digger Bay is located almost 10 miles from Highway 5.
 Shasta Marina Resort is located at Packers Bay in Lakehead, CA. Exit 693 off Highway 5, 16814 Packers Bay Road. Offering Large luxurious Houseboats, Ski Boats, Pontoon Boats, Sea Doos, Stand up Paddle Boards and Kayaks for rent. There is Houseboat and Covered Moorage, a year round Store with a Gas Dock, Food, Ice and Souvenirs. 
 Antler's Marina is Shasta's northernmost marina.
 Silverthorn Marina is located on the east part of the lake and offers large houseboats for rent.
 Jones Valley Resort is the easternmost marina on the lake. Jones Valley is tucked far into a cove and features six different model rental houseboats, including the largest on the lake, the Titan.
 Holiday Harbor is located up the McCloud River Arm, east of I-5.
 Sugarloaf Marina is located up the Sacramento River Arm and offers a marina store, overnight slips, and fuel.

Climate
Shasta Lake has a hot-summer mediterranean climate (Csa) typical of the interior of Northern California with hot, dry summers and cool, wet winters, along with great diurnal temperature variation.

Gallery

See also

Shasta Dam - creates Shasta Lake by impounding the Sacramento River
Shasta Unit — of the Whiskeytown–Shasta–Trinity National Recreation Area.
List of dams and reservoirs in California
List of largest reservoirs of California
List of lakes in California

References

External links
 Current Conditions, Shasta Lake, California Department of Water Resources

Shasta
Sacramento River
Central Valley Project
Pit River
Shasta-Trinity National Forest
Trinity Mountains (California)
Reservoirs in Northern California
Reservoirs in California